The Mewasi, or Mevasi, Mehwasi is a title of Koli caste found in Indian state of Gujarat. The Koli chieftains who ruled over villages populated by turbulent Kolis were titled as Mewasi because of their rebellious activities against Maratha and Mughal rulers.

In those days, Mewasi word was used to describe the unruly, turbulent and violent Kolis but during British Raj, Mewasi was used for Koli chieftains in rebellions against British rule as a hero.

Koli Mewasis liked the independent rule of self so they always fought against their Rajas, Maharajas and other rulers. Koli Mewasis often plundered the villages to collect the revenue.

In the fifteenth century , the early Sultans of Ahmedabad attempted to subjugate the Koli Mehwasis; but they were met with such a sturdy resistance from those chiefs, who were naturally helped by the wild nature of their Koli chiefs.

Firozkhan II ruled at Palanpur from 1707-1719, during which period he attacked and took Tharad which was ruled by Koli chieftain, subdued the Koli Mewasis of Sur Bhakhri, Kidotar and Dabhela and extended his territory.

The Rewakantha settlements were made during the regime of Sayajirao. these areas were constantly disturbed by the depredations of the Koli Mehwasis, and the maintenance of law and order in these areas became a challenge for Baroda government.

Clans 
Prominent clans of Koli Mewasis include:
 Baria

Mewasi villages 
The villages which were ruled or controlled by rebellious Koli chieftains and inhabited by turbulent Kolis were called Mewasi Villages by Mughal rulers.

The Barmuvada, Chhapra, Khumarwad were most notable Mewasi villages and their Koli chieftains were receiving Giras dues from Radhvanaj rulers.

The British government always faced the trouble in Mehwasi areas and used the troops to collect the annual revenue.

References 

Koli titles